Willemgastrura is a genus of springtails in the family Hypogastruridae. There is at least one described species in Willemgastrura, W. coeca.

References

Further reading

 
 
 

Springtail genera